The 1952 Florida State Seminoles football team represented Florida State University as an independent during the 1952 college football season. Led by Don Veller in his fifth and final season as head coach, the Seminoles compiled a record of 1–8–1.

Schedule

References

Florida State
Florida State Seminoles football seasons
Florida State Seminoles football